Apostolic Exarchate of Canada may refer to:
 Syro-Malabar Catholic Apostolic Exarchate of Canada
 Syriac Catholic Apostolic Exarchate of Canada
 Ukrainian Catholic Archeparchy of Winnipeg, formerly called as Apostolic Exarchate of Canada